The 1913 Paris–Tours was the tenth edition of the Paris–Tours cycle race and was held on 6 April 1913. The race started in Paris and finished in Tours. The race was won by Charles Crupelandt.

General classification

References

1913 in French sport
1913
April 1913 sports events